Piano Vortex is an album by American jazz pianist Matthew Shipp recorded in 2007 and released on Thirsty Ear's Blue Series. He leads a traditional acoustic piano trio with Joe Morris on bass and Whit Dickey on drums.

Reception

In his review for AllMusic, Thom Jurek states "Piano Vortex is the most intimate recording Shipp has made in a long while. He looks back through the music's history and speaks with it, as it informs his own extension of it."

The All About Jazz review by Troy Collins says "The trio blends turbulent swing with brooding ambience. Shipp's writing embodies a dusky, foreboding quality, coloring restless momentum with shades of uncertainty; his pieces veer from still melancholy to tumultuous agitation."

Track listing
All compositions by Matthew Shipp
 "Piano Vortex" – 10:27
 "Key Swing" – 3:21
 "The New Circumstance" – 9:12 
 "Nooks and Corners" – 4:10
 "Sliding Through Space" – 8:54
 "Quivering with Speed" – 6:39
 "Slips Through the Fingers" – 3:17
 "To Vitalize" – 7:13

Personnel
Matthew Shipp - piano
Joe Morris – bass
Whit Dickey – drums

References

2007 albums
Matthew Shipp albums
Thirsty Ear Recordings albums